Steve Scott (born 2 April 1955) is a New Zealand cricketer. He played in 35 first-class and 15 List A matches for Northern Districts from 1978 to 1986.

See also
 List of Northern Districts representative cricketers

References

External links
 

1955 births
Living people
New Zealand cricketers
Northern Districts cricketers
People from Matamata
Cricketers from Waikato